Palamas (Greek: Παλαμάς) is a town and a municipality in the Karditsa regional unit, Greece. Population 16,726 (2011). Palamas is located south-southwest of Larissa, the capital of Thessaly, northwest of Lamia, north of Sofades, east-northeast of Karditsa and east-southeast of Trikala.  Palamas is linked with the road linking Karditsa and Larissa. It also serves roads with the GR-6 (Larissa - Trikala - Ioannina - Igoumenitsa) and Sofades.  The Pineios River is to the north as well as the Trikala regional unit.

Municipality
The municipality Palamas was formed at the 2011 local government reform by the merger of the following 3 former municipalities, that became municipal units:
Fyllo
Palamas
Sellana

The municipality has an area of 382.722 km2, the municipal unit 154.077 km2.

Subdivisions
The municipal unit of Palamas is divided into the following communities:
Agios Dimitrios
Gorgovites
Kalyvakia
Koskina (Koskina, Psathochori)
Markos
Metamorfosi
Palamas
Vlochos (Vlochos, Lykorema)

Population

Notable people 
 

Manthos Falagas (born 1992), football player

References

External links

Populated places in Karditsa (regional unit)
Municipalities of Thessaly